Nunn v. State, 1 Ga. (1 Kel.) 243 (1846) is a Georgia Supreme Court ruling that a state law ban on handguns was an unconstitutional violation of the Second Amendment to the United States Constitution. This was the first gun control measure to be overturned on Second Amendment grounds.

Background
In 1837, Georgia passed a law banning the sale and carry of certain types of weapons included Bowie and other types of knives, and pistols.   Hawkins H. Nunn was charged and convicted for carrying a pistol in violation of the law.  He appealed the ruling, claiming the state law was a violation of the Second Amendment to the United States Constitution.  He did not make a claim under the Georgia constitution because Georgia, unlike many other states, did not have a similar protection of the right to bear arms within its constitution.

Ruling
The Nunn court ruled that while the legislature could prohibit the concealed carry of weapons, it could not prohibit the open carry of weapons.  To do so would be a violation of the Second Amendment right to carry weapons for self-defense.  As there was no proof that Nunn had been carrying his pistol concealed, the conviction was overturned.

Legal analysis
The court relied on guidance from other state decisions and general theories of rights to explain its decision.

Other state courts
The Nunn court referenced Bliss v. Commonwealth, 12 Ky. (2 Litt.) 90, 13 Am. Dec. 251 (1822) and State v. Reid, 1 Ala. 612, 35 Am. Dec. 44 (1840).  In Bliss, the defendant was charged with carrying a weapon concealed, in violation of a Kentucky statute.  The Bliss court invalidated the law as a diminution of the Kentucky constitution which provided, "that the right of the citizens to bear arms in defense of themselves and the State, shall not be questioned."  The court reasoned that the right as defined has no limits and "in fact consists of nothing else but the liberty."  Any restriction on the right, including the prohibition of concealed carry was a violation of the right.

In contrast the court in Reid upheld a similar ban on concealed carry.  The Alabama constitution read, "that every citizen has a right to bear arms in defence of himself and the State."  The Reid court held that the law "to suppress the evil practice of carrying weapons secretly," did not violate the Alabama constitution.  While the legislature could not prevent the carrying of arms, it did retain the right "to enact laws in regard to the manner in which arms shall be borne."  Because the restriction on concealed carry was not a prohibition on the right, it was within the ambit of the legislature to restrict concealed carry.

Fundamental rights
The Nunn court recognized that Reid and Bliss were applying clauses in state constitutions.  But, their decisions were relevant to Georgia because the state constitutional protection of the right to keep and bear arms was not a newly given right, but was a recitation of an already existent right.

The court held that the Second Amendment to the United States Constitution protected the rights of Georgia citizens because free people have the right to self-defense.  The fact that Georgia did not have a constitutional amendment did not empower the Georgia legislature to infringe on the right.  The right is fundamental, and no free society could exist where the right was prohibited.

 
The court also held that the whole people, not just militia were afforded the right to keep and bear arms.  And the type of arms was not restricted only to those borne by the militia but arms of every type and description.

The court's concept of rights meant that other portions of the Bill of Rights would also apply to the States.  For example, the court explained that the right to peaceably assemble, protected under the First Amendment, was applicable to both the national and state governments.  The court also cited to the New York case of People vs. Goodwin, 18 John. Rep. 200 (N.Y.Sup. 1820) which applied Fifth Amendment double jeopardy prohibitions to New York state court operations.  The court explained how to determine which constitutional provisions apply to the state and which applied only the federal government; the relevant question is whether the concepts in the constitution were confined only to the national government or if they could be extended to the states as well.  Citing Goodwin:

Modern significance
The Nunn court's decision has continuing relevance to the ongoing debate over gun rights.  The Supreme Court in its ruling in Heller v. District of Columbia said Nunn, "...perfectly captured the way in which the operative clause of the Second amendment furthered the purpose announced in the prefatory clause. ... "  The Nunn court concept of fundamental rights was relevant to determine whether or not the Second Amendment is a restriction only on the federal government or whether the right to keep and bear arms is a fundamental right that cannot be infringed by the state governments.

See also
Firearm case law in the United States

References

External links 
 Nunn v. State on Guncite.com 
  Guns in the Dock

Georgia (U.S. state) case law
Legal history of Georgia (U.S. state)
United States firearms law
1846 in United States case law
1846 in Georgia (U.S. state)
Law articles needing an infobox